The perritos de sandia (''Cyprinodon'' sp.) was an undescribed species of fish in the family Cyprinodontidae, which is now considered extinct. It was endemic to Mexico.

See also
Pupfish
Category: Cyprinodon  (Pupfish)

References

Cyprinodon
Endemic fish of Mexico
Fish of Mexico
Fish of North America becoming extinct since 1500
Undescribed vertebrate species
Taxonomy articles created by Polbot